Somewhere Far Beyond is the fourth studio album by German power metal band Blind Guardian. It was released in 1992 and produced by Kalle Trapp. The cover artwork was created by Andreas Marschall, who also drew the artwork for other Blind Guardian's releases (Tales from the Twilight World, Nightfall in Middle-Earth, etc.). The album saw the band creating its own original sound, while still employing most of their speed/power metal techniques.

The cover art and the two "Bard's Songs" gave the band its nickname "The Bards". The use of the nickname has been also extended to the fans of the group, Circle of the Bards being the now defunct fan club, and Hansi Kürsch frequently calling the fans "Bards".

"The Piper's Calling" contains the first three parts of the Great Highland Bagpipe 2/4 March, "The 79th's Farewell to Gibraltar", written by Pipe Major John MacDonald of the 79th Regiment of Foot (Cameronian Volunteers). Part of this composition also appears as a section of the title track, this time played on a different type of bagpipe.

The album was acclaimed by power metal fans all across Europe and especially Japan, allowing them to tour for the first time outside Germany. The tour in the Far East led to the band's first live album, Tokyo Tales.

Somewhere Far Beyond was remastered and re-released, with bonus tracks, on 15 June 2007. The album was again re-released and also remixed and remastered as part of A Traveler's Guide to Space and Time boxset.

Track listing

Lyrical references
 "Time What Is Time" is about the film Blade Runner from the perspective of a Replicant.
 "Journey Through the Dark"  is about Jhary a-Conel, a bard and a companion of the Eternal Champion, from the books by Michael Moorcock.
 "Black Chamber" deals with someone finding himself in the Black Lodge from Twin Peaks and facing a dark fate.
 "Theatre of Pain" is based on the fantasy novel The Merman's Children by Poul Anderson.
 "The Quest for Tanelorn" is about the Eternal Champion's search for a city called Tanelorn, a fictional city in The Multiverse of Michael Moorcock's stories.
 "Ashes to Ashes"  is based on reality; it has to do with the death of Hansi's father.
 "The Bard's Song – In the Forest" is inspired by the computer game The Bard's Tale.
 "The Bard's Song – The Hobbit" is based on J. R. R. Tolkien's The Hobbit.
 "Somewhere Far Beyond" is a retelling of Stephen King's The Dark Tower: The Gunslinger and The Drawing of the Three.
 "Trial by Fire" is about the atomic bombings of Hiroshima and Nagasaki. It's a cover of the heavy metal band Satan.

Personnel
Blind Guardian
 Hansi Kürsch – lead vocals, bass
 André Olbrich – lead, rhythm and acoustic guitar, backing vocals
 Marcus Siepen – rhythm and acoustic guitars, backing vocals
 Thomas "Thomen" Stauch – drums

Guest musicians
 Piet Sielck –effects, guitars
 Mathias Wiesner – effects, keyboards and bass on "Spread Your Wings"
 Rolf Köhler, Billy King and Kalle Trapp – backing vocals
 Stefan Will – piano
 Peter Rübsam – Scottish and Irish bagpipes
 Kai Hansen – lead guitar on "The Quest for Tanelorn"

Production and design
 Kalle Trapp – producing, mixing, recording
 Piet Sielck – second engineer
 Andreas Marschall/Becker — Derouet Hamburg – cover art
 Tom Nagy – photo
 a•r•t•p•o•o•l – graphics

Charts

References

1992 albums
Blind Guardian albums